Justin Mensah-Coker (born November 18, 1983 in North Vancouver, British Columbia) is a Canadian rugby union player who plays internationally with the Canada national team. He is of Sierra Leonean descent.

Before spending a season with Moseley in 2009, Mensah-Coker had brief stints with Plymouth Albion and with French club SC Albi. He made his Canada national team debut at the 2006 Churchill Cup in a match against the United States. Canada won the match 33–18 with Mensah-Coker scoring two tries. He was a regular selection for the national men's seven-a-side team through the 2010–2011 season.

Mensah-Coker began his rugby career at Kitsilano Secondary School and Meraloma Rugby Club.

References

External links
Justin Mensah-Coker's profile at moseleyrugby.co.uk

1983 births
Living people
Canadian rugby union players
Black Canadian sportspeople
Sportspeople from British Columbia
People from North Vancouver
Canadian people of Sierra Leonean descent
Canadian expatriate sportspeople in England
Moseley Rugby Football Club players
Canada international rugby union players
Plymouth Albion R.F.C. players
Canada international rugby sevens players
Male rugby sevens players
Rugby sevens players at the 2010 Commonwealth Games
Commonwealth Games rugby sevens players of Canada
Rugby sevens players at the 2006 Commonwealth Games